John Andrew Smith (January 13, 1847 - May 15, 1910) was a Democratic member of the Mississippi House of Representatives, representing Greene County, from 1896 to 1904.

Biography 
John Andrew Smith was born on January 13, 1847, in Mississippi. He served as the county supervisor of Greene County, Mississippi, for 3 terms. Smith first represented Greene County as a Democrat in the Mississippi House of Representatives for the 1896–1900 term. He served again for the 1900–1904 term. He died on May 15, 1910, and was buried in Mutual Rights Cemetery in Greene County.

Personal life 
Smith was a Methodist. He married Spicy Kittrell. Their daughter, Eleanor Almeada, was married to Columbus W. Walley, a Mississippi state senator from 1916 to 1920.

References 

1847 births
1910 deaths
Democratic Party members of the Mississippi House of Representatives
People from Greene County, Mississippi